Made in zhopa is the fourth album by the Russian ska punk group Leningrad. "Маде ин жопа" means 'Made in the Ass'. If it were to be in Russian, the album should be "Сделано в жопе", but the album name refers to the international expression "Made in..."

Track listing
"В клубе модном" - V klube modnom (In a Fashionable Club) – 2:47
"Полные карманы (У меня есть всё)" - Polnye karmany (U menya est' vsyo) (Full Pockets (I've Got Everything)) – 4:08 
"Не со мной" - Ne so mnoy (Not With Me) – 2:45
"Хип-Хоп" - Khip-Khop (Hip-Hop) – 2:04
"Миллион алых роз" - Million alykh roz (A Million Red Roses) – 3:44 
"Парнишка" - Parnishka (A Fellow) – 2:48
"Не слышны в саду" - Ne slyshny v sadu (Not Heard In the Garden) – 2:07
"Девушка с понятием" - Devushka s ponyatiyem (Girl With Concepts) – 2:08 
"Злые пули" - Zlye puli (Evil Bullets) – 1:30
"Свободная" - Svobodnaya (She is Free) – 3:03
"Эх раз, ещё раз" - Ekh raz, eshchyo raz (One Time, One More Time) – 2:13
"Стоп-машина" - Stop-mashina (Stop the car) – 2:17

External links
Album available for download from the official Leningrad website

2001 albums
Leningrad (band) albums